Amin Kazemi (born 7 May 1988) is an Iranian handball player for Bafgh Yazd and the Iranian national team.

References

1988 births
Living people
Iranian male handball players
Place of birth missing (living people)
Handball players at the 2014 Asian Games
Asian Games competitors for Iran
Handball players at the 2018 Asian Games
21st-century Iranian people